The genus Drosera was divided in 1994 by Seine & Barthlott into three subgenera and 11 sections on the basis of morphological characteristics.

Discovery and description of new species has been occurring since the 10th century, and as recently as the 1940s barely more than 80 species were known. In recent years, Australian Allen Lowrie has done extensive work in the genus, particularly in describing numerous new species from Australia. His classification of the genus was replaced by Jan Schlauer's work in 1996, although the correct classification is still disputed.

Drosera subg. Arcturia
Drosera arcturi
Drosera murfetii
Drosera stenopetala

Drosera subg. Bryastrum

D. sect. Bryastrum
Drosera pygmaea

Drosera sect. Lamprolepis

Drosera allantostigma
Drosera androsacea
Drosera barbigera
Drosera callistos
Drosera citrina
Drosera closterostigma
Drosera dichrosepala
Drosera echinoblastus
Drosera eneabba
Drosera enodes
Drosera gibsonii
Drosera grievei
Drosera helodes
Drosera hyperostigma
Drosera lasiantha
Drosera leucoblasta
Drosera leucostigma
Drosera mannii
Drosera microscapa
Drosera miniata
Drosera nitidula
Drosera nivea
Drosera occidentalis
Drosera omissa
Drosera oreopodion
Drosera paleacea
Drosera parvula
Drosera patens
Drosera pedicellaris
Drosera platystigma
Drosera pulchella
Drosera pycnoblasta
Drosera rechingeri
Drosera roseana
Drosera sargentii
Drosera scorpioides
Drosera sewelliae
Drosera silvicola
Drosera spilos
Drosera stelliflora
Drosera walyunga

Drosera subg. Coelophylla
Drosera glanduligera

Drosera subg. Drosera

Drosera sect. Arachnopus
Drosera hartmeyerorum
Drosera serpens
Drosera fragrans
Drosera aurantiaca
Drosera aquatica
Drosera barrettorum
Drosera nana
Drosera glabriscapa
Drosera margaritacea
Drosera indica
Drosera finlaysoniana

Drosera sect. Drosera

Drosera acaulis
Drosera admirabilis
Drosera affinis
Drosera afra
Drosera alba
Drosera aliciae
Drosera amazonica
Drosera anglica
Drosera arenicola
Drosera ascendens
Drosera bequaertii
Drosera biflora
Drosera brevifolia
Drosera burkeana
Drosera camporupestris
Drosera capensis
Drosera capillaris
Drosera cayennensis
Drosera cendeensis
Drosera chrysolepis
Drosera cistiflora
Drosera collinsiae
Drosera communis
Drosera cuneifolia
Drosera dielsiana
Drosera elongata
Drosera ericgreenii
Drosera esmeraldae
Drosera esterhuyseniae
Drosera felix
Drosera filiformis
Drosera glabripes
Drosera graminifolia
Drosera grantsaui
Drosera graomogolensis
Drosera hilaris
Drosera hirtella
Drosera hirticalyx
Drosera humbertii
Drosera intermedia
Drosera kaieteurensis
Drosera katangensis
Drosera linearis
Drosera longiscapa
Drosera madagascariensis
Drosera montana
Drosera natalensis
Drosera neocaledonica
Drosera nidiformis
Drosera oblanceolata
Drosera pauciflora
Drosera peruensis
Drosera pilosa
Drosera quartzicola
Drosera ramentacea
Drosera roraimae
Drosera rotundifolia
Drosera rubrifolia
Drosera schwackei
Drosera slackii
Drosera solaris
Drosera spatulata
Drosera spiralis
Drosera tentaculata
Drosera tokaiensis
Drosera tomentosa
Drosera trinervia
Drosera uniflora
Drosera venusta
Drosera villosa
Drosera viridis
Drosera yutajensis
Drosera zeyheri

Drosera sect. Prolifera
Drosera adelae
Drosera prolifera
Drosera schizandra
Drosera buubugujin

Drosera subg. Ergaleium

Drosera sect. Ergaleium

Drosera andersoniana
Drosera bicolor
Drosera bulbigena
Drosera erythrogyne
Drosera gigantea
Drosera graniticola
Drosera heterophylla
Drosera huegelii
Drosera intricata
Drosera macrantha
Drosera marchantii
Drosera menziesii
Drosera microphylla
Drosera modesta
Drosera moorei
Drosera myriantha
Drosera neesii
Drosera pallida
Drosera peltata
Drosera radicans
Drosera salina
Drosera stricticaulis
Drosera subhirtella
Drosera subtilis
Drosera sulphurea
Drosera zigzagia

Drosera sect. Erythrorhiza

Drosera aberrans
Drosera browniana
Drosera bulbosa
Drosera erythrorhiza
Drosera lowriei
Drosera macrophylla
Drosera orbiculata
Drosera praefolia
Drosera prostratoscaposa
Drosera rosulata
Drosera schmutzii
Drosera tubaestylis
Drosera whittakeri
Drosera zonaria

Drosera sect. Stolonifera

Drosera fimbriata
Drosera humilis
Drosera monticola
Drosera platypoda
Drosera porrecta
Drosera prostrata
Drosera purpurascens
Drosera ramellosa
Drosera rupicola
Drosera stolonifera

Drosera subg. Lasiocephala

Drosera banksii
Drosera brevicornis
Drosera broomensis
Drosera caduca
Drosera darwinensis
Drosera derbyensis
Drosera dilatato-petiolaris
Drosera falconeri
Drosera fulva
Drosera kenneallyi
Drosera lanata
Drosera ordensis
Drosera paradoxa
Drosera petiolaris
Drosera subtilis

Drosera subg. Meristocaulis
Drosera meristocaulis

Drosera subg. Phycopsis
Drosera binata

Drosera subg. Regiae

Drosera regia

Drosera subg. Stelogyne
Drosera hamiltonii

Drosera subg. Thelocalyx
Drosera burmannii
Drosera sessilifolia

Incertae sedis 
Drosera magnifica

References
 Barthlott, Wilhelm; Porembski, Stefan; Seine, Rüdiger; Theisen, Inge: Karnivoren. Stuttgart, 2004, 
 Lowrie, Allen: Carnivorous Plants of Australia, Vol. 1–3, Nedlands, Western Australia, 1987–1998 
 Schlauer, Jan: A dichotomous key to the genus Drosera L. (Droseraceae), Carnivorous Plant Newsletter, Vol. 25 (1996)

 
Drosera species
Drosera
Drosera